This is a list of fictional characters in the Ultraverse.

The line was published first by Malibu Comics and after a purchase, by Marvel Comics.

A
Aeon
The Alternate
Anything
Nick Apocaloff aka The Werewolf
Archimage
Arena
Argus
Atalon
Atom Bob

B
Backstabber
Battlewagon
Black Tiger
Blind Faith
Blood Mama
Bloodbath
Bloodgrip
Bloodrattle
Bloodshed
Bloodstorm
Bloodtrap
Bloodyfly
Boneyard
Book
Boomboy
Brazen
Breakdown
Bruut
Byter

C
 Captain USA
 Casino
 Catapult (see Exiles)
 Cayman
 Chalk
 Choice
 Codename: Firearm
 Contrary
 Culebra

D
 Dark Wave
 Deadeye (see Exiles)
 Death Dance
 Death Mask
 Deathwish
 Degenerate
 Deming, Dr. Rachel (see Exiles)
 Dirt Devil
 Discus
 D.J. Blast
 Doc Gross
 Doc Virtual
 Dog
 Double Edge
 Dragonfly
 Dropkick
 Duet
 Duey

E
 ElectroCute
 Eliminator
 Elven
 The Entity

The Exiles
The first Exiles comic was written by Steve Gerber and illustrated by Paul Pelletier, with plot contributions from Tom Mason, Dave Olbrich, and Chris Ulm (who came up with the concept and handed it to Gerber to expand upon when they got too busy to execute it).

The four issues of Exiles covered a time period of only 18 hours. This group was founded and led by Dr. Rachel Deming, and introduced Ghoul (one of Ultraforce's main members) and Amber Hunt to the Ultraverse. Much of the plot revolved around a fatal "Theta Virus", the treatment of which gave the characters their superhuman powers. However, Dr. Deming assumed that people with powers are automatically superheroes, and their lack of training, cohesion, and leadership led to disaster. Aside from Deming (who suffered many fractures), Ghoul (who was already more or less a zombie, and thus later rose from his grave), Deadeye (who survived the tidal wave and later left the team) and Hunt, the other members of the team were Catapult, Mustang, Tinsel, and Trax. Mastodon was introduced in the series, but never joined the team, and eventually appeared in the pages of Foxfire.

Their members were: 
 Catapult (Kevin Albers) – had the ability to absorb inertia and turn it into super strength. He is killed by aliens while in a coma.
 Deadeye (Frank Hayes) – Frank has incredible accuracy with ranged weapons. His current whereabouts are unknown.
 Dr. Rachel Deming – Rachel cured the others of the Theta Virus and put them together as a team when the cure gave them superpowers. Current whereabouts unknown.
 Ghoul (Jonathan Martin) – Has appearance of a corpse, can reform body after it was damaged, talk to the dead, and sense when a person was near death. Joined Ultraforce.
 Amber Hunt – Amber can manipulate heat and flames, as well as fly. Joined Ultraforce.
 Mustang (Roderick Hartley) – can generate electricity, killed in explosion.
 Tinsel (Melissa Scott) – blinded by cure so she had to wear a special visor to see, could generate light for various effects, she was shot to death by Bloodbath.
 Trax (Judd Shepard) – has ability to sense danger and track others by their bio-signature. Killed in explosion.

F
 Feline
 Firearm
 Flygirl
 Forsa
 Foxfire

G
 G.E.N.I.E. (see Aladdin)
 Gangsta
 Gate
 Gecko
 Gemini (see Aladdin)
 Generator X
 The Genius
 Ghoul
 Glare
 Guise
 Grenade
 The Grip
 Gun Nut
 Gunk

H
 Hardcase
 Hardwire
 Harmonica
 Headknocker
 Heater
 Hellblade
 Hellion
 Hot Rox
 Hunt, Amber
 Hunt, J.D.

I
 Incoming
 Iron Clad

J
 Janus
 Jinn
 Johnson, Erik (see Aladdin)
 Juggernaut (see Siren (comics) featuring Shuriken)

K
 King Pleasure
 Kismet Deadly
 Kort, Malcolm
 Kutt

L
 Lady Killer
 Lament
 Leland, Stanley (see Ultra-Tech)
 Lightshow
 Lone, Antone
 Lost Angel
 Lord Pumpkin - a sorcerer and enemy of Ultraforce created by writer Dan Danko

M
 Mangle
 Manhattan Project
 Maniac
 Mannequin
 Mantra
 Master of the Hunt
 Mastodon
 Maxi-Man
 Maxis
 Meathook
 Mister Mischief
 Monkey Woman
 Moon-Man
 Mosh
 Mosley, Edwin
 Mundi, Rex
 Mustang (see Exiles)

N
 Naiad
 Necromantra
 Needler
 Nemesis (see Infinity Gems)
 Neuronne
 The Night Man
 NM-E
 Notch

O
 The Old Man
 The Operator
 Outrage

P
 Papa Verité
 Phade
 The Pilgrim
 Pinnacle
 Pistol
 Pixx (see Ultraforce)
 Planet Class
 Plug
 Powerhouse
 Pressure
 Prime
 Primevil
 Prototype

Q
 Quixote

R
 Rafferty
 Ranger
 Rayder, Gen. Holden S. (see Aladdin)
 Rhiannon
 Rigoletto
 Ripfire
 Rivermen
 Robinson, Noel
 Rodent
 Rune
 Rush

S
 Shadowmage
 Shuriken
 Siren
 Slayer
 Sludge
 Solitaire
 Spectral
 Starburst
 Strike
 Supreme Soviet
 Sweetface

T
 Taboo
 Tech
 Teknight
 Tinsel (see Exiles)
 Topaz
 Torso
 Trax (see Exiles)
 Trouble
 Tugun
 Turbo
 Turf
 Tyrannosaur

V
 Veffir Voon Lyax
 Veil
 Vinaigrette

W
 War Eagle
 Warstrike
 Wicca
 Witch Hunter
 Wrath
 Wreckage

X
 Xanadu Amalgamated

Y
 Yrial

Z
 Zip-Zap

Teams
 Aladdin Assault Squad
 Bash Brothers
 Blood Brothers
 The Cabal
 The Dragon Fang
 Eliminators
 Exiles
 The All-New Exiles
 Freex
 The Inquisitors
 Omega Team
 Quattro
 The Radicals
 The Raiders
 The Solution
 The Sportsmen
 The Squad
 The Strangers
 TNTNT
 Techuza
 Terrordyne
 Ultraforce
Ultra-Violence

Government agencies
 Aladdin
 The Lodge

Races
 Aerwa
 Darkur
 Fire People
Hesshites
 The Primals
 The Tradesmen
 The Vyr
 Ultras

References

Ultraverse